Dead Man is the soundtrack to the 1995 Jim Jarmusch western-themed film of the same name starring Gary Farmer, and Johnny Depp as William Blake.  Neil Young recorded the soundtrack by improvising (mostly on Old Black, his famously customized electric guitar, with some acoustic guitar, piano and organ) as he watched the newly edited film alone in a recording studio. The soundtrack album consists of seven instrumental tracks by Young, with dialog excerpts from the film and Johnny Depp reading the poetry of William Blake interspersed between the music.  The version of the main theme used over the film's beginning and end credits is not included, but was released as a promo single. The soundtrack differs from the film in that it uses background noises of a driving car while the film is set in a time before automobiles were widely available.

Pitchfork ranked the soundtrack at 15 on their 50 Best Movie Scores of All Time list, saying that "Old Black is featured in its purest form on the soundtrack for Jim Jarmusch’s hallucinatory western Dead Man. Young’s low, ominous notes are inseparable from Robby Müller’s striking black-and-white cinematography, lending an elemental pull to the increasingly strange odyssey of William Blake (Johnny Depp) and Nobody (Gary Farmer), Blake’s sardonic Native American guide."

Releases 

The album was released in 1996 on CD and vinyl. In addition to a standard CD release, a "special edition" was released, which was bound in a customized cover.  Made to look like a 19th-century photo album, the spine is covered in a mauve-brown cloth and the cover itself is a black laminated cardboard.  The booklet normally included in the CD is bound in this "book" along with a cardboard folder to hold the disc itself.

A reissue of the album was released on 8 March 2019. In addition, the album is available for streaming in 24bit/44.1 kHz quality on Neil Young Archives website.

Track listing
Track names aren't listed anywhere on the physical copies of the album.

"Theme from Dead Man"
The main theme of the film, an instrumental tune featuring acoustic and electric guitar which plays during opening and closing credits, wasn't included on the soundtrack album (although the motif is reprised throughout it). It was only issued as a rare promo CD single before the album release. A music video was also released, featuring excerpts of the film mixed with studio footage of Young recording the soundtrack.

References

Neil Young soundtracks
Western film soundtracks
1996 soundtrack albums
Albums produced by Neil Young
Albums produced by John Hanlon
Experimental rock soundtracks